Epermenia trifilata is a moth in the family Epermeniidae. It was described by Edward Meyrick in 1932. It is found on Java in Indonesia.

References

Epermeniidae
Moths described in 1932
Moths of Indonesia